Kampel may refer to:

 Kampel, Koper, a settlement south of Škocjan, Slovenia
 Kampel, Indore, a settlement in Madhya Pradesh, India